"Bad Cover Version" is a song by British rock band Pulp, from their 2001 album We Love Life. It was released 15 April 2002 as the second single from the album, charting at number 27 in the UK Singles Chart. It was the band's last single before their eight-year hiatus, which ended in 2011. CD1's B-sides appear as bonus tracks on the US release of We Love Life. The B-sides to CD2 are cover versions of Pulp songs performed by other artists.

Background
"Bad Cover Version" began as an instrumental written by Pulp keyboardist Candida Doyle. Cocker then added lyrics; he recalled, "I wrote the words at night, then went to bed, woke up in the morning and thought 'I bet they're really shit, them words.' But then when I sang them they worked out alright". Cocker later called it "just a pop song" but said that he felt it was "quite emotional." The song's working title was "Candy's Spectre."

Lyrics
The song details the protagonist's belief that his former partner's current relationship is inferior to what she had with him. The latter part of the song is a list of things the narrator likens said relationship to, including The Rolling Stones since the 1980s, the TV adaptation of Planet of the Apes, and later episodes of Tom and Jerry where Tom and Jerry could talk.

Most notable is the reference to "the second side of 'Til the Band Comes In", a 1970 album by Scott Walker who produced "Bad Cover Version", along with the rest of the We Love Life album. 'Til the Band Comes In contains original songs on side 1, and mostly cover songs on side 2; Cocker explained, "That record's always mystified me... It's like he just kind of gets sick of the whole thing and gives up halfway through the record." Jarvis Cocker stated that the lyrics were written before he knew that Walker would be involved. He recalled,

Release
According to Island Records' Nigel Coxon, there was "big debate" over whether to release another single from We Love Life, given the relative under-performance of previous single "Sunrise"/"The Trees". He explained, "[The record company] wants new stuff, to be fed new hits, all the time. It's just this overriding idea that Pulp are an old has-been". Pulp did convince Island to release one more single, but the dispute resulted in a late release of April 2002.

In addition to non-album tracks "Yesterday" and "Forever in My Dreams", the single release featured on its B-side two covers of Pulp songs: Nick Cave's version of "Disco 2000" and Róisín Murphy's version of "Sorted for E's & Wizz". The single reached number 27 in the UK.

The cover for the single is similar to the cover of David Bowie's famous album The Rise and Fall of Ziggy Stardust and the Spiders from Mars. The child on the cover is Pulp's guitarist Mark Webber.

Video
The song's video features many celebrity lookalikes who gather in a West London studio to perform a "tribute" to Pulp, in a similar style to the video for Band Aid's "Do They Know It's Christmas?". All the lookalikes appear to perform their own lines in the style of the artists they are impersonating, with the exception of the Jarvis Cocker lookalike, who is miming to Cocker's vocal. Cocker himself appears in the video dressed as Brian May, playing the guitar note that ends the song. Kurt Cobain, who died in 1994, is the only impersonated artist who was not alive at the time of the song's release.

The list of impersonated artists

Singers:
 Robbie Williams
 Liam Gallagher
 Kylie Minogue
 David Bowie
 George Michael
 Bono
 Paul McCartney
 Craig David
 Jennifer Lopez
 Sophie Ellis-Bextor
 Tom Jones
 Björk
 Kurt Cobain
 Rod Stewart
 Meat Loaf
 Cher

 Jay Kay
 Jarvis Cocker
 Mick Jagger
 Elton John
 Missy Elliott
 Bob Geldof
Guitarists:
 Noel Gallagher
 Paul McCartney
 Keith Richards
 Brian May
Percussionists:
 Phil Collins
 Gary Numan
Producer:
 Jeff Lynne

Track listings

Personnel
Jarvis Cocker - lead vocals, electric guitars
Mark Webber - acoustic guitar, backing vocals
Candida Doyle - keyboards, backing vocals
Steve Mackey - bass, backing vocals
Nick Banks - drums, bells, backing vocals
Scott Walker - backing vocals

References

External links
 Bad Cover Version on PulpWiki

Pulp (band) songs
2002 singles
Song recordings produced by Chris Thomas (record producer)
Songs written by Jarvis Cocker
Songs written by Candida Doyle
Songs written by Nick Banks
Songs written by Steve Mackey
Songs written by Mark Webber (guitarist)
2002 songs
Island Records singles